Pond Branch is a  long 1st order tributary to the Dan River in Halifax County, Virginia.

Course 
Pond Branch rises about 2 miles southwest of Centerville, Virginia, and then flows generally southeast to join the Dan River about 0.5 miles southwest of South Boston.

Watershed 
Pond Branch drains  of area, receives about 45.6 in/year of precipitation, has a wetness index of 421.49, and is about 65% forested.

See also 
 List of Virginia Rivers

References

Watershed Maps 

Rivers of Virginia
Rivers of Halifax County, Virginia
Tributaries of the Roanoke River